Chore of Enchantment is a studio album by the alternative rock band Giant Sand. It was released in March 2000 by Thrill Jockey.

Reception

The British music journalism publication NME praised the album's "raw but tender empathy in songs full of unexpected departures".

Legacy
The album was included in the book 1001 Albums You Must Hear Before You Die.

Track listing
All tracks were written by Howe Gelb.

 "Overture" – 0:48
 "(Well) Dusted (For the Millennium)" – 3:47
 "Punishing Sun" – 3:13
 "X-Tra Wide" – 3:27
 "1972" – 1:03
 "Temptation of Egg" – 3:41
 "Raw"	 – 3:29
 "Wolfy" – 4:25
 "Shiver" – 4:00
 "Dirty from the Rain" – 3:34
 "Astonished (In Memphis)" – 5:32
 "No Reply" – 4:34
 "Satellite" – 6:48
 "Bottom Line Man" – 4:41
 "Way to End the Day" – 4:47
 "Shrine" – 2:04

Personnel
Howe Gelb – guitar, piano, vocals
John Convertino – drums
Joey Burns – bass guitar, cello, guitar, backing vocals
Juliana Hatfield – backing vocals (6)
Sofie Albertsen Gelb – backing vocals (9, 15)
Jim Dickinson – mellotron (2), piano, organ (11)
John Parish – piano, pump organ (15), door shutter (16)
Kevin Salem – guitar (3), acoustic guitar (4), mellotron (9)
Susan Marshall-Powell – backing vocals (4, 11)
Jackie Johnson – backing vocals (4, 11)
William Brown – backing vocals (4)
Rich Mercurio – drums (4, 9)
John Abbey – bass guitar (4, 8, 12)
Rob Arthur – mellotron (4), organ (9, 12)
Nick Luca – piano (5)
Neil Harry – pedal steel (7)
Alan Bezozi – drum loop (8)
Scott Loder – bass guitar (9)
David Mansfield – pedal steel (9, 12), banjo (9)
Lydia Kavanaugh – backing vocals (12)
Paula Brown – bass guitar, backing vocals (13)
Rainer Ptacek – slide guitar (16)

References

External links
Chore of Enchantment at Thrill Jockey

2000 albums
Giant Sand albums
Albums produced by John Parish
Thrill Jockey albums
Fire Records (UK) albums
Albums produced by Jim Dickinson